Lithocarpus gracilis is a tree in the beech family Fagaceae. The specific epithet  is from the Latin meaning "slender", referring to the twigs.

Description
The greyish brown bark is smooth, fissured or scaly.

Distribution and habitat
Lithocarpus gracilis grows naturally in Peninsular Malaysia, Sumatra and Borneo. Its habitat is mixed dipterocarp (including kerangas) forests to  altitude.

Uses
The timber is locally used in construction.

References

gracilis
Trees of Peninsular Malaysia
Trees of Sumatra
Trees of Borneo
Plants described in 1970